The National Legislature (Al-Maǧlis al-Ttašriyʿiy) is the legislative branch of the government of the Republic of the Sudan.

Prior to the 2019 coup d'état, the National Legislature was composed of two chambers:

 The Council of States (Al-Maǧlis al-Wilāyāt) had 50 members who are indirectly elected by state legislatures. 
 The National Assembly (Al-Maǧlis al-Waṭaniy) had 450 directly elected members.

The National Legislature was dissolved on 11 April 2019 following the overthrow of President Omar al-Bashir and his National Congress Party in a military coup.

As part of the 2019 Sudanese transition to democracy, a Transitional Legislative Council is to be formed which will function as the legislature of Sudan until elections scheduled for 2022.

Parliament building 
The seat of the National Legislature is in Omdurman, immediately north-west of the country's capital Khartoum. The building was designed in the style of brutalist architecture by the Romanian architect Cezar Lăzărescu and completed in 1978. It is located on the banks of the White Nile at the confluence with the Blue Nile near the old Omdurman bridge.

See also
Transitional Legislative Council (Sudan)
List of legislatures by country

References

External links

 
2005 establishments in Sudan
Sudan
Government of Sudan
Sudan
Sudan